Shepherds United is an association football club from Port Vila, Vanuatu. Formed in the 1980s, it is a club affiliated to the Port Vila Football Association and currently plays in the league's First Division after being relegated from the Premier division in the 2015-16 season.

Honours
Port Vila Football League:
Winners (0):
Runners-up (2): 2002, 2003

Current squad

References

Football clubs in Vanuatu
Port Vila
Association football clubs established in the 1980s
1980s establishments in Vanuatu